Bolshaya Dubrava is a rural locality (a settlement) in Bryansky District, Bryansk Oblast, Russia. The population was 27 as of 2013. There is 1 street.

Geography 
Bolshaya Dubrava is located 4 km southeast of Glinishchevo (the district's administrative centre) by road. Staroselye is the nearest rural locality.

References 

Rural localities in Bryansky District